The Tokaido Road is a 1991 historical novel by Lucia St. Clair Robson.  Set in 1702, it is a fictional account of the famous Japanese  revenge story of the Forty-Seven Ronin. In feudal Japan, the Tōkaidō (meaning "Eastern Sea Road") was the main road, which ran between the imperial capital of Kyoto (where the Emperor  lived), and the administrative capital of Edo (now Tokyo where the shōgun lived).

External links
Tokaido Road at Lucia St. Clair Robson's website

Footnotes

References

1991 American novels
American historical novels
Novels by Lucia St. Clair Robson
Fiction set in 1702
Novels set in Japan
Ballantine Books books
Novels set in the 18th century
Japan in non-Japanese culture